The Gladiators is a 1963 photograph by John O'Gready of Norm Provan and Arthur Summons. A memorable sporting image from Australia, the award-winning photo later became the model for the NSWRL premiership Winfield Cup trophies from 1982 to 1995 and the NRL trophies since 1998.

The 1963 NSW Rugby League Premiership Grand Final between long term rivals Western Suburbs and St George was played in a torrential downpour on Saturday, 24 August. This, combined with the fact that the centre cricket pitch area of Sydney Cricket Ground was notoriously muddy in such conditions, ensured that the players were not only saturated but also caked in mud from head to toe.  At the conclusion of the hard-fought match which was won by St George, the captains of the two teams, the tall Norm Provan and more diminutive Summons respectively, embraced in appreciation of each other's stoic efforts. The moment was captured by a newspaper photographer, John O'Gready, and published in the following day's The Sun-Herald. Subsequently, the image won several awards, becoming known as The Gladiators. Summons has recently said that The Gladiators actually shows him complaining about the referees decision to Norm Provan. This image was the inspiration for the current premiership trophy's bronze statue.

In 2008 the Western Suburbs Magpies celebrated their centenary by inducting six inaugural members into the club's Hall of Fame. These six included Summons.

The Provan-Summons Trophy is the NRL's main prize, awarded to the team that wins the premiership. Its sculptured design is similar to the Winfield Cup trophy, which, despite its name, was introduced for the 1982 NSWRFL season. It is a three-dimensional cast of a famous photo called The Gladiators, which depicts a mud-soaked Norm Provan of St. George and Arthur Summons of Western Suburbs embracing after the 1963 NSWRFL season's Grand Final. It was not officially named the Provan-Summons Trophy until 2013, the 50th anniversary of the 1963 Grand Final. The trophy is awarded following each grand final to the captain of the winning club.

Each player from the premiership winning side are also awarded Premiership Rings.

See also

Sports photography

References

1963 works
1963 in art
Australian photographs
Black-and-white photographs
Sports photographs
Rugby football culture
New South Wales Rugby League premiership
1960s photographs